Paul Whitehead Teaches Chess is a 1985 video game published by Enlighten.

Gameplay
Paul Whitehead Teaches Chess is a game in which chess master Paul Whitehead teaches chess to a beginner or middle level player.

Reception
Roy Wagner reviewed the game for Computer Gaming World, and stated that "There were some minor elements of the programming that I found objectionable, but overall the program is an excellent way to learn about the game of chess. The tone of the tutorial is very understandable. This program is highly recommended."

References

External links
Review in Family Computing
Review in Compute!'s Gazette
Review in Info
Review in Hardcore Computist
Review in RUN Magazine
Review in InCider
Article in Commodore Magazine
Review in PC World
Review in Commodore Microcomputers

1985 video games
Apple II games
Chess software
DOS games
Video games based on real people
Video games developed in the United States